Greater London does not currently have an official flag to represent the region. However, the current Greater London Authority and predecessor bodies have historically flown and used many flags and symbols.

London County Council

London County Council was created in 1889, replacing the Metropolitan Board of Works. The council was granted a coat of arms in 1914 and flew a banner of these arms over County Hall from 1923 onwards. The arms depicted waves representing the River Thames, the flag of England and a lion to signify London's status of the capital city of England and the United Kingdom and a mural crown.

Greater London Council
London County Council was replaced by the Greater London Council in 1965 which covered a larger area. The Greater London Council was subsequently granted a coat of arms which contained elements taken from the arms of its predecessor bodies, waves taken from the arms of London County Council and a Saxon crown taken from the arms of Middlesex County Council. The flag of the Greater London Council consisted of its coat of arms displayed on a white field. The common seal of the GLC depicted the coat of arms of the council surrounded by london landmarks and the words "THE COMMON SEAL OF THE GREATER LONDON COUNCIL: 1964".

Greater London Authority
The Greater London Council was abolished in 1986 and Greater London remained without a strategic local government body until the Greater London Authority was created in 2000. For the first few months of its existence, the Greater London Authority used a logo depicting a representation of the course of the River Thames against a green disk also containing the name of the authority. This was subsequently replaced by a wordmark, created by design agency Appetite, consisting of the word LONDON with the letters LOND in blue and ON in red. A flag depicting this logo was flown outside City Hall, the headquarters of the Greater London Authority.

From 31 January 2020, after Brexit (which Greater London voted against), a flag based on an campaign graphic originally launched in 2016 was flown, the design consisting of a white field charged with the word "LONDON" where the letters "O" in the word are representations of the globe showing different hemispheres and with the legend "EVERYONE WELCOME" in smaller letters below. These flags were all based on logos or were for political campaigns however; none represented an official flag or arms assigned to the Authority. 

In February 2020, London Assembly member and Deputy Mayor Tom Copley proposed a motion calling on the Mayor of London to ask the College of Arms to transfer the arms of the Greater London Council to the Greater London Authority. The motion received unanimous support from assembly members however Mayor Sadiq Khan, while supporting the request in principle, asked the assembly to consider costs involved and to reconfirm the decision the following month.

The Chair of the London Assembly wears the ceremonial badge of office that was previously worn by the Chairman of the Greater London Council. The badge, which depicts the coat of arms of the Greater London Council and the letters GLC, is made of 18 ct gold with 29 diamonds, four clusters of 8 small pearls and a pendant pearl.

The Greater London Authority makes bylaws under its common seal. This is a wafer seal consisting of a disc containing no symbol or insignia surrounded by the words "COMMON SEAL OF THE GREATER LONDON AUTHORITY".

See also
Flag of the City of London
History of local government in London

References

External links

Greater London
Greater London